Saucisson de Lyon is a large cured pork sausage (saucisson sec) in Lyonnaise cuisine. It sometimes includes some beef or a liqueur.

It is similar to other large French cured sausages such as those of Arles, Lorraine, and Burgundy.

See also
 List of sausages

References

French sausages
Fermented sausages